The 2021–22 Oklahoma Sooners men's basketball team represented the University of Oklahoma during the 2021–22 NCAA Division I men's basketball season. The team was led by first-year head coach Porter Moser and played their home games at Lloyd Noble Center in Norman, Oklahoma, as members of the Big 12 Conference. They finished the season 19-16, 7-11 in Big 12 Play to finish in 8th place. They defeated Baylor in the quarterfinals of the Big 12 tournament before losing in the semifinals to Texas Tech. They were one of the last four teams not selected for the NCAA tournament so they received an at-large bid to the National Invitation Tournament where they defeated Missouri State in the First Round before losing in the Second Round to St. Bonaventure.

Previous season
In a season limited due to the ongoing COVID-19 pandemic, the Sooners finished the 2020–21 season 16–11, 9–8 in Big 12 play to finish in a tie for sixth place. As the No. 7 seed in the Big 12 tournament, they defeated Iowa State before losing to Kansas in the quarterfinals. They received an at-large bid to the NCAA tournament as the No. 8 seed in the West region. There they defeated Missouri in the First Round before losing to Gonzaga in the Second Round. 

Following the season, 10th-year head coach Lon Kruger retired. Shortly thereafter, the school named Loyola head coach Porter Moser the team's new head coach.

Offseason

Coaching changes
On April 16, 2021, Moser finalized his coaching staff. David Patrick was named associate head coach while Emanuel Dildy and K.T. Turner were named assistants. Clayton Custer was named director of video operations and player development while Matt Gordon was named special assistant to the head coach.

Departures

Incoming transfers

2020 recruiting class

Roster

Schedule and results

|-
!colspan=9 style=|Exhibition

|-
!colspan=9 style=|Regular season

|-
!colspan=9 style=|Big 12 Tournament

|-
!colspan=9 style=|NIT Tournament

References

Oklahoma
Oklahoma Sooners men's basketball seasons
Oklahoma